José Guadalupe Concepción Estudillo (1838-1917) was a Californio politician, who served as California State Treasurer and treasurer of San Diego County. He was a member of the prominent Estudillo family of California.

Early life
José G. Estudillo is the son of José Antonio Estudillo, a prominent early settler of San Diego, California.

Career
He served as County treasurer during 1864–1875, city councilman of San Diego, and California State Treasurer, 1875–1880.

Later, he moved to Los Angeles and married Adelaide Mulholland.

External links
 Smythe's History of San Diego (1907-09), part 2, chapter 6 has a short biography

Californios
State treasurers of California
American politicians of Mexican descent